Imperial Palaces of the Ming and Qing Dynasties in Beijing and Shenyang may refer to:

 Forbidden City in Beijing
 Mukden Palace in Shenyang

World Heritage Sites in China